Marthinus Johannes Strydom (born 28 April 1965) is a South African author, venture capitalist and private equity investor. He is the CEO and Chairman of the MJS Capital Group, a seed stage venture capital company headquartered in Pretoria. Strydom is the lead investor for MJS Capital in companies such as Extremely Gifted Geeks, Coffee Today, Concierge Group, Klippz, Exotic Vacations, and Ribrack. Prior to creating the MJS Capital Group, Strydom was the chief information officer and Marketing Director of automotive group, McCarthy Limited.

Strydom is regarded as the pioneer of e-commerce in South Africa. He created the first e-commerce portal in South Africa and continued to create numerous B2C and B2B e-commerce companies.

Strydom was voted as one of South Africa's top ten IT personalities by IT Web in 2012. Eliance, a MJS Capital company in 2013, was awarded the best company to work for by Deloitte. Exotic Vacations has been awarded the top leisure travel company in South Africa for nine consecutive years.

Early life
Strydom was born in Johannesburg. He is the son of Hans and Gertie Strydom. His father was journalist and author , who wrote the best-selling book The Super Afrikaners that exposed the Afrikaner Broederbond. Strydom spent his early childhood in Cape Town. The Strydom family moved to Johannesburg in 1973. He graduated from the Die Kruin Art school in 1982. Strydom was conscripted into the South African Defence Force (SADF) where he became an unarmed combat (Krav Maga) instructor. He continued teaching Krav Maga to the SANDF and South African Police (SAP). Through exchange programs he participated in military training and skills transfer exercises with the Israel Defence Forces.

Career
Strydom initially intended to become a lawyer but early into his studies changed his mind. Instead he pursued entrepreneurship. He was the founder of The Peninsula Times, the largest community newspaper in South Africa. In 2012, he created MJS Capital, a seed stage venture capital company.

Investments
Strydom has invested in a number of startups primarily in the tech industry but also in other industries.

Books
 Taste The World (2022), 
 The Stoic Way: A Practical Guide To Living With Purpose And Resilience (2022),

Extremely Gifted Geeks (EGG)
The EGG fund was created in 2012, and focuses on investments in early stage technology companies. EGG Inc consists of the EGG Incubator in Johannesburg, South Africa, EGG Fund - the investment arm and EGG Bursary, the personal development division.

Martial Arts
Strydom studied martial arts since his early teens and has been an instructor for 30 years. He owned three training schools in South Africa from 1985 to 2010. In 1983, he became the South African middleweight WKA kickboxing champion. In 1998, he created the martial arts style Shinai Kempo based on a number of practical martial arts styles including Krav Maga, Kenpo and Jiu jitsu.

Photography and art
Strydom is a photographer and artist.

References

South African chief executives
Living people
1965 births
Chief information officers